Thomas Guggeis (born 1993) is a German conductor and pianist. He is Kapellmeister at the Staatsoper Berlin and the designated Generalmusikdirektor (GMD) of the Oper Frankfurt.

Life and career 
Born in Dachau, Bavaria, Guggeis studied conducting at the Hochschule für Musik und Theater München and the Conservatorio Giuseppe Verdi in Milan. He also received a bachelor's degree in quantum mechanics. He began his professional career as repetiteur at the Staatsoper Berlin, where he was an assistant of Daniel Barenboim. He was internationally recognized there when he stepped in at short notice to conduct Ariadne auf Naxos by Richard Strauss.

Guggeis received the Förderpreis of the Ritter-Stiftung in Straubing in 2014, and was nominated for the Deutscher Dirigentenpreis in 2017. He was Kapellmeister at the Staatsoper Stuttgart from the 2018/19 season, where he conducted operas such as Puccini's La Bohème and Madama Butterfly, Rossini's Il barbiere di Siviglia, Henze's Der Prinz von Homburg and Weber's Der Freischütz. He conducted for the first time at the Theater an der Wien in Vienna in 2019, a new production of Weber's Oberon.

Guggeis returned to the Staatskapelle Berlin in 2020, and was awarded the title Staatskapellmeister, as the youngest conductor to date. He led there Ariadne auf Naxos and Mozart's Die Zauberflöte, followed after a break due to the COVID-19 pandemic by Verdi's Falstaff.

Guggeis conducted Ariadne auf Naxos at the Oper Frankfurt in his first opera at the house in June 2021. In October 2021, he was designated to become the next Generalmusikdirektor (GMD) in Frankfurt, succeeding Sebastian Weigle and to assume the position with the 2023/24 season, first for a five-year period.

References

External links 
 
 Thomas Guggeis Staatsoper Berlin

German pianists
German conductors (music)
Musicians from Berlin
University of Music and Performing Arts Munich alumni
Milan Conservatory alumni
1993 births
Living people